Father and Son Lake is a lake located on Vancouver Island, British Columbia, Canada, at the head of Franklin River.

References

Alberni Valley
Lakes of Vancouver Island
Barclay Land District